Church of the Nativity is a historic Roman Catholic church on the National Register of Historic Places in Menlo Park, California. It was built in 1887 and added to the National Register in 1980.

History
The church was constructed in 1872 and was moved on log rollers twice before arriving at its current location in 1877. This earned it the nickname of the "Roaming Catholic Church."

In 1996 the church adopted the tradition of Perpetual Adoration, with members of the church volunteering to pray continuously in an uninterrupted chain, and has continued for over 20 years.

The current pastor at the Church of the Nativity is the Rev. Msgr. Steven D. Otellini, brother to past Intel CEO Paul Otellini, and, because of the church's proximity to Saint Patrick's Seminary and University in Menlo Park, weekend assistants often include young or international priests. Nearby are the Vallombrosa Center retreat house and the Corpus Christi Monastery of Dominican sisters. The parish serves a predominantly Anglo Catholic community and has an associated parochial school, Nativity School. With a relatively strong academic reputation locally, students from Nativity School have gone on to such local high schools as Sacred Heart Preparatory (Atherton, California), Saint Francis High School (Mountain View), Mercy High School (Burlingame, California), Bellarmine College Preparatory, and Notre Dame High School (Belmont, California) as well as colleges including Stanford University, Loyola Marymount University, California Polytechnic State University, New York University, University of California, Berkeley, University of California, Davis, and Saint Mary's College of California among others.

References

External links

Nativity Catholic School

Roman Catholic churches in California
National Register of Historic Places in San Mateo County, California
Carpenter Gothic church buildings in California
Roman Catholic churches completed in 1887
Buildings and structures in San Mateo County, California
Churches on the National Register of Historic Places in California
19th-century Roman Catholic church buildings in the United States